Frostproof is a city in Polk County, Florida, United States. The city is located in southern Polk County on the Lake Wales Ridge. The population was 2,992 at the 2010 census. As of 2018, the population estimated by the U.S. Census Bureau is 3,273. It is part of the Lakeland–Winter Haven Metropolitan Statistical Area.

History

The settlement in the area now known as Frostproof was established in 1850. This settlement, like many in central Florida at the time, was set up as a fort and was called Fort Clinch. The fort was named after the local Lake Clinch which was, in turn, named after the Seminole War commander Duncan Lamont Clinch.

This settlement was abandoned only months later. By the 1880s, Frostproof began to see its first permanent settlers as homesteaders were attracted to the abundant hunting in the area which included much deer and turkey, as well as ample fishing.

The name was a marketing ploy to convince potential landowners that the town has never had, and never would have, a frost that could destroy the large citrus-driven economy. However, only a couple of years later, a frost during The Great Freeze of 1895 killed most of the citrus in Frostproof. Prior to being named Frostproof, the town was named Keystone City. However, after being confused regularly with Keystone Heights, a city in North Florida, Frostproof was coined.

W.H. Overocker applied for the first post office here in 1892, with a name of Keystone City. Postal authorities disallowed it because there was already a Keystone Heights in Florida. Joseph Washington Carson suggested Frostproof as a substitute, but Overocker instead chose Lakemont. Carson's choice of Frostproof was based on the town's relatively minor damage from the freeze in December 1894 which ruined much of the state's citrus crop.

Carson volunteered to deliver the application to the post office in Fort Meade, and on the way changed the name from Lakemont to Frostproof, which was approved. Overocker, to his surprise, was appointed the postmaster of Frostproof. The early post office was located on the corner of Wall Street and Carson Avenue.

After many delays, Frostproof first received rail service in 1912.

Geography

Frostproof is located between two lakes: Lake Clinch and Lake Reedy. Frostproof is located within the Central Florida Highlands area of the Atlantic coastal plain with a terrain consisting of flatland interspersed with gently rolling hills.

Frostproof is located in the humid subtropical zone, as designated by (Köppen climate classification: Cfa). In spite of the city's name, Frostproof experiences at least one night of sub-freezing temperatures during 65% of its winters.

Demographics

As of the census of 2000, there were 2,975 people, 1,119 households, and 792 families residing in the city. The racial makeup of the city was 78.22% White, 3.90% African American, 0.84% Native American, 0.07% Asian, 0.07% Pacific Islander, 14.35% from other races, and 2.55% from two or more races. Hispanic or Latino of any race were 21.65% of the population.

There were 1,119 households, out of which 29.7% had children under the age of 18 living with them, 52.0% were married couples living together, 13.8% had a female householder with no husband present, and 29.2% were non-families. 24.4% of all households were made up of individuals, and 14.8% had someone living alone who was 65 years of age or older. The average household size was 2.66 and the average family size was 3.11.

In the city, the population was spread out, with 26.7% under the age of 18, 11.2% from 18 to 24, 23.6% from 25 to 44, 20.5% from 45 to 64, and 18.1% who were 65 years of age or older. The median age was 35 years. For every 100 females, there were 101.7 males. For every 100 females age 18 and over, there were 98.5 males.

The median income for a household in the city was $30,412, and the median income for a family was $33,707. Males had a median income of $27,234 versus $18,273 for females. The per capita income for the city was $15,396. About 14.7% of families and 16.8% of the population were below the poverty line, including 21.1% of those under age 18 and 9.0% of those age 65 or over.

Notable people

 Adam W. Greenway, president of Southwestern Baptist Theological Seminary in Fort Worth, Texas
 Ben Hill Griffin Jr., founder of the citrus empire, politician, and member of the Forbes 400 in 1989
 Alvin Harper, former American football wide receiver
 Travis Henry, former American football running back
 Nickell Robey, cornerback for the Los Angeles Rams

Business
Frostproof is home to the Latt Maxcy Corporation and Ben Hill Griffin, Inc., both members of the agricultural cooperative Florida's Natural. Frostproof is also home to the Historic Ramon Theater built in 1925.  The theater is still in operation and hosts live music and entertainment as well as murder mystery events.  Frostproof's Historic Train Depot built in 1912 has been renovated and is "Polk County's Newest Old Attraction."

Media

The city has a weekly newspaper, the Frostproof News.
The Ledger, based in Lakeland, is the most popular daily newspaper. 
While there are no television stations located in Frostproof, broadcast signals from Tampa Bay and Orlando area television stations are available. 
Most cable and satellite providers offer Tampa Bay and Orlando area stations.
One of the most notable authors in Frostproof is Bea Reifeis who has written several books on Frostproof heritage and history.  These books are sold in the Frostproof Historical Museum along with the Piney Wood Rooters book.

Transportation

 State Road 17 – The Scenic Highway, leading north to Lake Wales
 US 27 – A four-lane divided highway running north–south just west of town, also leading northward to Lake Wales, and southward to Sebring.
 US 98 – Running west from US 27, this road leads to Ft. Meade and eventually to Bartow and Lakeland. Southbound, it is co-signed with US 27.
The Historic Downtown District runs East and West between Lake Clinch and Lake Reedy on Wall Street.
Frostproof's Historic Train Depot no longer has passenger trains or freight arriving or departing; however, it is open for tours and is now the Mister Chris Coffee Gallery & Depot. And is known for being Polk County's Newest Old Attraction.

Education
The public schools in Frostproof are operated by the Polk County School Board. There are three schools in Frostproof: Frostproof Middle/Senior High, Frostproof Elementary and Ben Hill Griffin Elementary. The high school in Frostproof has won the state football championship three times—in 1974, 1992, and 1999—and the state softball championship once, in 2006

References

External links

 Frostproof Government Website
 Frostproof News, newspaper that serves Frostproof, Florida available in full-text with images in Florida Digital Newspaper Library
 Frostproof Chamber of Commerce

Cities in Polk County, Florida
Populated places established in 1850
Cities in Florida
1850 establishments in Florida